Hugh Spooner (born 25 November 1957) is a Canadian sprinter. He competed in the men's 4 × 100 metres relay at the 1976 Summer Olympics.

References

External links
 

1957 births
Living people
Athletes (track and field) at the 1976 Summer Olympics
Canadian male sprinters
Olympic track and field athletes of Canada
Athletes (track and field) at the 1979 Pan American Games
Pan American Games track and field athletes for Canada
Black Canadian track and field athletes
Athletes from Toronto